The Kerrang! Awards 2011 were held in London, England, on 9 June 2011, at The Brewery in Romford and were hosted by Slipknot singer Corey Taylor and Anthrax guitarist Scott Ian.

On 4 May 2011, Kerrang! announced the 2011 nominees. The main categories were dominated by My Chemical Romance with five nominations, Thirty Seconds to Mars with four and Avenged Sevenfold, The Blackout, Bullet for My Valentine, and Bring Me the Horizon with three apiece. Thirty Seconds to Mars was the biggest winner of the night, taking home two awards.

Nominations
Winners are in bold text.

Best British Newcomer
Asking Alexandria
Blitz Kids
The Dead Lay Waiting
Francesqa
Octane OK

Best International Newcomer
Black Veil Brides
Destroy Rebuild Until God Shows
Hyro Da Hero
The Pretty Reckless
We Are the In Crowd

Best British Band
The Blackout
Bring Me the Horizon
Bullet for My Valentine
Enter Shikari
You Me at Six

Best International Band
Thirty Seconds to Mars
All Time Low
Avenged Sevenfold
My Chemical Romance
Paramore

Best Live
Thirty Seconds to Mars
All Time Low
Avenged Sevenfold
Bullet for My Valentine
My Chemical Romance

Best album
Avenged Sevenfold – Nightmare
The Blackout – Hope
Bring Me the Horizon – There Is a Hell Believe Me I've Seen It. There Is a Heaven Let's Keep It a Secret.
Escape the Fate – Escape the Fate
My Chemical Romance – Danger Days: The True Lives of the Fabulous Killjoys

Best Single
Thirty Seconds to Mars – "Hurricane"
Bring Me the Horizon – "Blessed with a Curse"
Bullet for My Valentine – "Your Betrayal"
My Chemical Romance – "Planetary (Go!)"
Panic! at the Disco – "The Ballad of Mona Lisa"

Best Video
Thirty Seconds to Mars – "Hurricane"
A Day to Remember – "All I Want"
The Blackout – "Higher & Higher"
My Chemical Romance – "Na Na Na (Na Na Na Na Na Na Na Na Na)"
Young Guns – "Stitches"

Classic Songwriter
Biffy Clyro

Devotion Award
Skindred

Kerrang! Inspiration
Def Leppard

Kerrang! Icon
Alice Cooper

Kerrang! Hall of Fame
Korn

Kerrang! Legend
Ozzy Osbourne

References

External links
Kerrang! Awards official website

2011
2011 music awards
2011 in London
Culture in London
2011 in British music